Molly Goddard (born 16 December 1988) is a London-based, British fashion designer.

Early Life 
Daughter of Sarah Edwards and Mark Goddard, Molly grew up in Ladbroke Grove and has a sister. She trained at Central Saint Martins with the intention of working for a fashion house, not thinking she could have her own brand. Her eponymous brand came "accidentally" in 2015 when she started to struggle at the school and threw a fashion party for friends with designs that soon became noticed and took orders.

Career 

In 2016, Goddard was awarded the Emerging Talent award at The Fashion Awards and was shortlisted for the LVMH Prize 2017. In May 2018, Goddard won the BFC/Vogue Designer Fashion Fund, winning the BFC Fashion Trust grant in May 2019.

Her style involves directly manipulating materials, not just creating designs, for which she prefers to use cheaper fabrics. Vogue credits her style as one of the progenitors of feminism in fashion, noting that while "At first glance, her clothes may look frou-frou, [...] she likes them to have a subversive streak".

The success of her label in the United States has been attributed to singer Rihanna wearing her designs on red carpets since 2016, and celebrity muses, like model Edie Campbell, who first walked for Goddard in Spring/Summer 2018. More recently, Molly Goddard dresses featured in the BBC and BBC America television show Killing Eve on actress Jodie Comer. In 2022, Harry Styles wore a Molly Goddard blouse on the cover of his album, Harry's House.In 2019, she was one of the designers hired by the Metropolitan Museum of Art to create merchandise for the Met Gala and the museum's own 'Camp'-themed exhibit.

Personal Life 
Goddard has a son with partner Tom Shickle.

See also
Villanelle's pink Molly Goddard dress

References

Living people
British fashion designers
British women fashion designers
Year of birth missing (living people)
1988 births